|}

The Spa Novices' Hurdle, known for sponsorship purposes as the Albert Bartlett Novices' Hurdle, is a Grade 1 National Hunt hurdle race in Great Britain which is open to horses aged five years or older. It is run on the New Course at Cheltenham over a distance of about 3 miles (2 miles 7 furlongs and 213 yards, or 4,822 metres), and during its running there are twelve hurdles to be jumped. The race is for novice hurdlers, and it is scheduled to take place each year during the Cheltenham Festival in March.

It was one of several new races introduced at the Festival when a fourth day was added to the meeting in 2005. For its first three runnings the event was sponsored by Brit Insurance, and it was classed at Grade 2 level. The vegetable growing company Albert Bartlett began supporting the race in 2008, and since then it has held Grade 1 status. The race was originally open to horses aged four years or older, but since 2023 four year olds have been excluded.

Records
Leading jockey (3 wins):
 Tony McCoy – Black Jack Ketchum (2006), Wichita Lineman (2007) At Fishers Cross (2013)

Leading trainer (3 wins):
 Willie Mullins – Penhill (2017), Monkfish (2020), The Nice Guy (2022)

Winners

See also
 Horse racing in Great Britain
 List of British National Hunt races

References
 Racing Post:

 thejockeyclub.co.uk/cheltenham/ – Media information pack (2010).

National Hunt races in Great Britain
Cheltenham Racecourse
National Hunt hurdle races
Recurring sporting events established in 2005
2005 establishments in England